Euspilotus is a genus of clown beetles in the family Histeridae. There are more than 80 described species in Euspilotus.

Species
These 87 species belong to the genus Euspilotus:

 Euspilotus aequipunctatus (Horn, 1870)
 Euspilotus alcyonis Bousquet & Laplante, 2006
 Euspilotus alvarengai Arriagada, 2012
 Euspilotus amazonius (Desbordes, 1923)
 Euspilotus arcipygus (Schmidt, 1890)
 Euspilotus argentinus (Marseul, 1870)
 Euspilotus arrogans (Marseul, 1855)
 Euspilotus assimilis (Paykull, 1811)
 Euspilotus aterrimus (Erichson, 1834)
 Euspilotus auctus (Schmidt, 1890)
 Euspilotus azurescens (Marseul, 1855)
 Euspilotus azureus (C.R.Sahlberg, 1823)
 Euspilotus batesoni (Blair, 1933)
 Euspilotus bisignatus (Erichson, 1834)
 Euspilotus blandus (Erichson, 1834)
 Euspilotus bohemanni (Marseul, 1862)
 Euspilotus burgeoisi (Desbordes, 1920)
 Euspilotus caesopygus (Marseul, 1862)
 Euspilotus campechianus (Marseul, 1855)
 Euspilotus canalisticus (Marseul, 1855)
 Euspilotus carinipennis (Desbordes, 1924)
 Euspilotus colombicus (Kirsch, 1889)
 Euspilotus conformis (J. E. LeConte, 1845)
 Euspilotus connectens (Paykull, 1811)
 Euspilotus convexiusculus (Marseul, 1855)
 Euspilotus crenatipes (Solier, 1849)
 Euspilotus cribrum (Casey, 1893)
 Euspilotus cubaecola (Marseul, 1855)
 Euspilotus decoratus (Erichson, 1834)
 Euspilotus detractus (Casey, 1893)
 Euspilotus devius Lewis, 1909
 Euspilotus disnexus (Schmidt, 1890)
 Euspilotus dolatus (Marseul, 1862)
 Euspilotus emys (Marseul, 1870)
 Euspilotus eremita (Marseul, 1870)
 Euspilotus erythropleurus (Marseul, 1855)
 Euspilotus excavata Arriagada, 2012
 Euspilotus flaviclava (Marseul, 1870)
 Euspilotus innubus (Erichson, 1834)
 Euspilotus insertus (J.L.LeConte, 1851)
 Euspilotus insularis (Marseul, 1855)
 Euspilotus inversus (Lewis, 1899)
 Euspilotus jenseni (Bickhardt, 1911)
 Euspilotus lacordairei (Marseul, 1855)
 Euspilotus laesus (Lewis, 1900)
 Euspilotus laridus (J.L.LeConte, 1851)
 Euspilotus latimanus (Schmidt, 1890)
 Euspilotus lentus (Casey, 1893)
 Euspilotus lepidus (Erichson, 1847)
 Euspilotus limatus (Marseul, 1870)
 Euspilotus loebli Mazur, 1974
 Euspilotus malkini (Wenzel, 1960)
 Euspilotus micropunctatus (Hatch, 1962)
 Euspilotus milium (Marseul, 1855)
 Euspilotus minutus (J.E.LeConte, 1844)
 Euspilotus modestus (Erichson, 1834)
 Euspilotus mormonellus (Casey, 1924)
 Euspilotus myrmecophilus (Bickhardt, 1910)
 Euspilotus obductus (J.L.LeConte, 1851)
 Euspilotus ornatus (Blanchard, 1843)
 Euspilotus parenthesis (Schmidt, 1890)
 Euspilotus patagonicus (Blanchard, 1843)
 Euspilotus pavidus (Erichson, 1834)
 Euspilotus perrisi (Marseul, 1872)
 Euspilotus pipitzi (Marseul, 1887)
 Euspilotus placidus (Erichson, 1834)
 Euspilotus prosternalis (Hinton, 1935)
 Euspilotus pusio (Hinton, 1935)
 Euspilotus pygidialis (Lewis, 1903)
 Euspilotus richteri Lewis, 1909
 Euspilotus rossi (Wenzel, 1939)
 Euspilotus rubriculus (Marseul, 1855)
 Euspilotus russatus (Marseul, 1855)
 Euspilotus scissus (J. L. LeConte, 1851)
 Euspilotus scrupularis (J. E. LeConte, 1860)
 Euspilotus simulatus (Blatchley, 1910)
 Euspilotus socius (Casey, 1893)
 Euspilotus spinolae (Solier, 1849)
 Euspilotus sterquilinus (J.E.LeConte, 1860)
 Euspilotus strobeli (Steinheil, 1869)
 Euspilotus subvicinus (Marseul, 1855)
 Euspilotus sydovi (Bickhardt, 1911)
 Euspilotus turikensis Kanaar, 1993
 Euspilotus vinctus (J. L. LeConte, 1851)
 Euspilotus wacoensis (Horn, 1873)
 Euspilotus wenzeli (Mazur, 1984)
 Euspilotus zonalis Lewis, 1907

References

Further reading

 
 

Histeridae
Articles created by Qbugbot